The Palais des Sports (Besançon), also known as Palais des sports Ghani-Yalouz, is an indoor sports arena, located in Besançon, France. The capacity of the arena is 4,000 people. The stadium is named after Ghani Yalouz, a French former Olympic wrestler.

Tenants 
It is currently home to handball clubs ESBF Besançon (competing in the premier women's handball league) and Grand Besançon Doubs Handball (second level of the men's handball).

It used to be home to the Besançon Basket Comté Doubs basketball team until the team got liquidated and ceased to exist.

Capacity 
The capacity of the arena is adjustable:

 Handball configuration: 3 380 seats
 Basketball configuration: 4 200 seats

References

Indoor arenas in France
Basketball venues in France
Buildings and structures in Besançon
Sports venues in Doubs
Sport in Besançon